Martin Dichev (born 22 August 2000) is a Bulgarian football player who plays as a left-back for Cherno More Varna.

Career
Dichev began his career with Cherno More at the age of eight and progressed through the club's academy.

In May 2020, Dichev returned to Cherno More, signing first professional contract in his career. He made his first team debut for the club in a 4–0 away win against Etar on 16 August 2020, coming on as a substitute for Viktor Popov.

Career statistics

Club

References

External links
 

Living people
2000 births
Bulgarian footballers
Bulgaria youth international footballers
PFC Cherno More Varna players
PFC Dobrudzha Dobrich players
First Professional Football League (Bulgaria) players
Association football defenders
Sportspeople from Varna, Bulgaria